The 1966 football season was São Paulo's 37th season since club's existence.

Overall
{|class="wikitable"
|-
|Games played || 52 (9 Torneio Rio-São Paulo, 28 Campeonato Paulista, 15 Friendly match)
|-
|Games won || 23 (5 Torneio Rio-São Paulo, 12 Campeonato Paulista, 6 Friendly match)
|-
|Games drawn || 15 (0 Torneio Rio-São Paulo, 10 Campeonato Paulista, 5 Friendly match)
|-
|Games lost || 14 (4 Torneio Rio-São Paulo, 6 Campeonato Paulista, 4 Friendly match)
|-
|Goals scored || 93
|-
|Goals conceded || 66
|-
|Goal difference || +27
|-
|Best result || 5–0 (A) v Ituveravense - Friendly match - 1966.04.21
|-
|Worst result || 0–3 (A) v Palmeiras - Campeonato Paulista - 1966.12.15
|-
|Most appearances || 
|-
|Top scorer || 
|-

Friendlies

Torneio Laudo Natel

Official competitions

Torneio Rio-São Paulo

Record

Campeonato Paulista

Record

External links
official website 

Association football clubs 1966 season
1966
1966 in Brazilian football